Lark Voorhies (born Lark Holloway; March 25, 1974) is an American actress, singer, spokeswoman and model. Voorhies rose to fame playing Lisa Marie Turtle on the NBC sitcom Saved by the Bell (1989–1993). Voorhies was nominated for the Young Artist Award six times, winning in 1990 and 1993 for her work on the show.

Early life
Born Lark Holloway to Wayne and Tricia Holloway in Nashville, Tennessee, she later adopted "Voorhies" as a stage name. Her mother named her "Lark" after the character in the 1972 film Cool Breeze, played by Margaret Avery. By the time Voorhies was two years old, the family had moved to Pasadena, California. During this period, her mother took her to a talent agent, because of her belief that Voorhies was "a natural-born ham." However, her first audition ended poorly when she froze up. She appeared in a national television commercial for Universal Studios Tour at age 12, advertising its upcoming King Kong attraction. She said of the experience: "I was on this tram screaming with all these other people. I had such a great time doing that."

Entertainment career

Acting
Voorhies made her acting debut at the age of two. Though photogenic, she was shy, and her mother put Voorhies' acting career on hold until she was more comfortable in front of the cameras. Later, at the age of fourteen, Voorhies reappeared on an episode of Small Wonder in 1988. In June of that same year, she landed the role of Lisa Turtle in Disney Channel's television series Good Morning, Miss Bliss and appeared in thirteen episodes from 1988 to 1989. She remained as the same character, as did Zack, Screech, and Mr. Belding, after Disney dropped the series and it was picked up and retooled by NBC and renamed Saved by the Bell.

Voorhies has since appeared in several television sitcoms and soap operas. She played the role of single mom Wendy Reardon on Days of Our Lives in 1993. On The Bold and the Beautiful Voorhies played the role of amiable intern fashion-designer, Jasmine Malone beginning in September 1995. She was released from her contract in November 1996 when her role required her to act in sex scenes, which the actress refused to do citing her religious beliefs as a Jehovah's Witness.

In 1995, Voorhies guest-starred in the Star Trek: Deep Space Nine episode "Life Support". During the same year, Voorhies guest-starred in the Family Matters season six episode "Home Sweet Home", as Eddie's upstairs dream girl. She has continued to act in various roles since then, such as In the House, in which she played the girlfriend-turned-wife of Alfonso Ribeiro’s character, Dr. Max Stanton. Previously, she played Ribeiro's love interest twice on The Fresh Prince of Bel-Air. Besides sitcoms, Voorhies also appeared in movies and direct-to-video films. In 2001, Voorhies played a major role in the film How High as Lauren, a Harvard student. She was involved in a 1990 movie adaptation of the book The Black Man's Guide to Understanding Black Women and played Ana Smith in the 2008 movie The Next Hit. Although she only has two acting credits since 2008, and none since 2012, Voorhies' representatives cited a busy work schedule when she did not appear in a SBTB-based mini-reunion sketch on "Late Night with Jimmy Fallon" alongside Gosselaar, Lopez, Thiessen, and Dennis Haskins in 2015. Voorhies publicly stated in 2020 that she was "hurt" that she was not invited to participate in the Saved by the Bell sequel series on Peacock. Later that year, however, NBC announced that Voorhies would in fact reprise her role as Lisa Turtle for the new show.

Music
Voorhies has appeared in several music videos. She plays Kenny Lattimore's love interest in his debut video "Never Too Busy", from his 1996 self-titled debut album. In Boyz II Men's music video "On Bended Knee", she plays Wanya's girlfriend. She is featured in Montell Jordan's "Somethin' for the Honeyz" and in Dru Hill's "These Are the Times". In 1994, Voorhies was in a group originally called the X-Girls (now known as Geneva) with Stacee and Yashi Brown (the daughters of singer and oldest Jackson family sibling, Rebbie Jackson). Voorhies founded and was the lead singer in Third Degree, an alternative band.

Writing
Over 2010 and 2011, Voorhies self-published three books she authored: Reciprocity, Trek of the Cheshire, and A True Light.

Personal life
Voorhies dated her Saved by the Bell co-star Mark-Paul Gosselaar for three years during the show's run. Voorhies was engaged to actor Martin Lawrence in 1993 but it was later called off in 1994. Voorhies married Miguel Coleman in 1996. They separated in 2001, and divorced in 2004. Voorhies met music engineer Jimmy Green at a networking event in 2014. After a year of dating, Voorhies and Green married on April 30, 2015, at a chapel in Las Vegas, Nevada. Voorhies filed for divorce in October 2015 after six months of marriage.

Voorhies has schizoaffective disorder.

Dealings with media
On May 30, 2006, Voorhies filed a lawsuit against The National Enquirer for libel over an article that included claims published in June 2005 that she had a drug problem. The case was dropped in less than two months.

Books authored

Filmography

Television

Film

Awards and nominations

References

External links

 

1974 births
21st-century American actresses
20th-century American actresses
20th-century African-American women
20th-century African-American people
21st-century African-American women
21st-century African-American people
Actresses from Tennessee
African-American actresses
American child actresses
American film actresses
American Jehovah's Witnesses
American soap opera actresses
American television actresses
Living people
People from Nashville, Tennessee
Actresses from Pasadena, California
People with bipolar disorder
People with schizoaffective disorder